The Yellow Bank River is a  tributary of the Minnesota River in western Minnesota in the United States.  It is formed by the confluence of two longer streams, the North Fork Yellow Bank River and the South Fork Yellow Bank River, which also flow in northeastern South Dakota.  Via the Minnesota River, the Yellow Bank River is part of the watershed of the Mississippi River, draining an area of approximately 460 square miles (1,190 km²) in an agricultural region.

The river was named for yellowish glacial drift in bluffs along the river.  Its name was translated from the Sioux language as "Spirit Mountain Creek" by William Keating in his account of Stephen Harriman Long's expedition to the region in 1823.  It was labelled as "Yellow Earth River" on an 1860 map of Minnesota.

Geography
The river's north and south forks each rise in South Dakota on the Coteau des Prairies, a morainic plateau dividing the Mississippi and Missouri River watersheds, and flow across till plains into Minnesota. The north fork issues from Round Lake near South Shore in northeastern Codington County, South Dakota, and flows eastwardly for  through central Grant County into northwestern Lac qui Parle County, Minnesota. The south fork rises in northwestern Deuel County, South Dakota, approximately six miles (10 km) southwest of Strandburg, and flows generally northeastwardly for  through southern Grant County and western Lac qui Parle County, passing near the community of Nassau, Minnesota. In the Big Stone refuge, the river flows among woodlands of American elm, ash, box elder, and silver maple, and may be fished.

Flow rate
At the United States Geological Survey's stream gauge in Agassiz Township south of Odessa, 4.5 miles (7.2 km) upstream from the river's mouth, the annual mean flow of the river between 1940 and 2005 was 69.3 cubic feet per second (2 m³/s).  The highest recorded flow during the period was 6,940 ft³/s (197 m³/s) on April 9, 1969.  Readings of zero were recorded on numerous days during several years.

See also
List of rivers of Minnesota
List of rivers of South Dakota

References

Notes

Sources

Books

Websites

Software
Google Earth elevations for Geographic Names Information System coordinates.  Retrieved on 2007-06-15.

Rivers of Minnesota
Rivers of South Dakota
Tributaries of the Minnesota River
Rivers of Grant County, South Dakota
Rivers of Lac qui Parle County, Minnesota
Rivers of Codington County, South Dakota